Killian Timoney (born September 5, 1975) is an American politician and educator serving as a member of the Kentucky House of Representatives from the 45th district. Elected in November 2020, he assumed office on January 1, 2021.

Early life and education 
Timoney was born in Ithaca, New York. He earned Bachelor of Arts and Master of Arts degrees from the University of Kentucky.

Career 
From 1999 to 2012, Timoney worked for the Lexington-Fayette Urban County Government in the parks and recreation department. He was also a teacher in the Fayette County Public Schools before becoming assistant principal of Watterson Elementary in Jefferson County, Kentucky. Timoney then returned to the Fayette County Public Schools and has since served as associate principal of Winburn Middle School and director of plant operations.

References 

1975 births
People from Ithaca, New York
University of Kentucky alumni
Republican Party members of the Kentucky House of Representatives
Living people